Ponta Moreia is the northernmost point of the island of Santiago, Cape Verde. It is about 2 km north of the nearest village, Fazenda, and around 5 km north of Tarrafal.

There is a lighthouse near the headland, Farol de Ponta Moreia. It is an 8 metres high tower, with a focal plane of 97 meters above sea level.

References

Headlands of Cape Verde
Geography of Santiago, Cape Verde
Tarrafal Municipality